Countess Agatha Marie of Hanau-Lichtenberg (22 August 159923 May 1636) was a daughter of Count Johann Reinhard I (1569-1625) and his wife, Countess Maria Elisabeth of Hohenlohe-Neuenstein (1576-1605).

Agatha Marie was born in Buchsweiler (now Bouxwiller). She died on 23 May 1636 in the city of Baden (now called Baden-Baden) and was buried in Rappoltsweiler (now called Ribeauvillé).

Marriage and issue 
He was a son of Eberhard of Rappoltstein (12 March 1570 – 17 August 1637 in Strasbourg) and the Wild- and Rhinegravine Anna of Kyrburg-Mörchingen (1572 – 25 August 1608). After Agatha Marie's death, George Frederick would remarry in 1640 to Countess Elisabeth Charlotte of Solms-Sonnewalde.

From her marriage Agatha Marie had two children:
 Stillborn son.
 Agatha Fredericka ( – ).

Ancestors

References 
 Reinhard Dietrich: Die Landesverfassung in dem Hanauischen, in the series Hanauer Geschichtsblätter, vol. 34, Hanau, 1996, 
 Detlev Schwennicke: Europäische Stammtafeln: Stammtafeln zur Geschichte der Europäischen Staaten
 Reinhard Suchier: Genealogie des Hanauer Grafenhauses, in: Festschrift des Hanauer Geschichtsvereins zu seiner fünfzigjährigen Jubelfeier am 27. August 1894, Hanau, 1894
 Ernst J. Zimmermann: Hanau Stadt und Land, 3rd ed., Hanau, 1919, reprinted 1978

House of Hanau
German countesses
People from Saverne
1599 births
1636 deaths